Luciana Maria Arrighi  (born 1940) is a Brazilian-born, Australian-Italian production designer. In 1993, she won an Oscar for Best Art Direction for the film Howards End (1992), becoming the first Brazilian-born person to win an Oscar. She also earned two more Oscar nominations in the same category for The Remains of the Day (1993) in 1994, and Anna and the King (1999) in 2000. In 2003, she won the BAFTA Award for Best Art Direction for the television film The Gathering Storm (2002).

Career
Luciana Arrighi was born in Rio de Janeiro, Brazil in 1940, daughter of Italian diplomat and former journalist Count Ernesto Arrighi, and Australian Eleanor ("Nellie"), daughter of grazier Douglas Cox. Nellie had been a showgirl with J.C. Williamson Ltd, and later a model for Schiaparelli in Paris, and was distantly related by marriage to the novelist Patrick White (Her paternal grandfather's sister was married to Patrick White's great-uncle); over the course of their long friendship they claimed "cousinhood". Ernesto Arrighi was appointed consul at Melbourne in 1937, and met Nellie on a visit to Sydney. They married in 1939, and Ernesto was posted to Rio de Janeiro, where Luciana, their first child, was born. The family returned to Rome in 1943 before going to Nice on the French Riviera, and after the surrender of Italy to the Allies Ernesto was imprisoned by the Germans for "high treason" in 1943. On his release, he was given a diplomatic posting to Sydney, his wife and two daughters going ahead of him, but he died suddenly before being able to join them. 

Arrighi left Brazil with her parents when she was two years old and was raised and educated in Australia, studying at East Sydney Technical College (now the National Art School). She went to the United Kingdom, where she worked for the BBC; she was spotted by Ken Russell, who used her talents in some of his early films such as Isadora Duncan, the Biggest Dancer in the World (1966) and Women in Love (1969).

She went on to study painting in Italy and she has also worked in costume design in theatre and opera, including with Vienna State Opera, Opera Australia and The Royal Opera, Covent Garden. She lived in Paris for two years and was a model for French fashion designer Yves Saint Laurent.

In 1993, Arrighi received the Silver Ribbon for Best Production Design Award and the Oscar for Best Art Direction for the film Howards End directed by James Ivory. She was also nominated for an Oscar for Best Art Direction for the film The Remains of the Day (1993), also by James Ivory, and Anna and the King (1999) by Andy Tennant. She won the British BAFTA Award for Best Art Direction for the television film The Gathering Storm (2002), directed by Richard Loncraine.

Personal life
In 1970, Arrighi married Captain Rupert Milo Talbot Chetwynd (1934-2021), of the Grenadier Guards and 21st SAS Regiment, later an adventurer and founder of a medical mission to Afghanistan. He was a descendant of the 6th Viscount Chetwynd. They had a son, Aaron, and daughter, Alalia, the artist Monster Chetwynd. Arrighi splis her time between London and France.

Filmography

Production design
Scenographer:

 Monitor (1965), director David Jones, 1 episode
 Isadora Duncan, the Biggest Dancer in the World (1966), TV, director Ken Russell
 Omnibus (1967), 1 episode
 Sunday Bloody Sunday (1971), director John Schlesinger
 The Night the Prowler (1978), director Jim Sharman
 My Brilliant Career (1979), director Gillian Armstrong
 The Return of the Soldier (1982), director Alan Bridges
 Privates on Parade (1983), director Michael Blakemore
 The Ploughman's Lunch (1983), director Richard Eyre
 Mrs. Soffel (1984), director Gillian Armstrong
 Madame Sousatzka (1988), director John Schlesinger
 The Rainbow (1989), director Ken Russell
 Bye Bye Columbus (1991), TV, director Peter Barnes
 Close My Eyes (film) (1991), director Stephen Poliakoff
 Howards End (film) (1992), director James Ivory
 The Innocent (1993), director John Schlesinger
 The Remains of the Day (film) (1993), director James Ivory
 Only You (1994 film) (1994), director Norman Jewison
 Sense and Sensibility (film) (1995), director Ang Lee
 Surviving Picasso (1996), director James Ivory
 Victory (1996 film) (1996), director Mark Peploe
 Oscar and Lucinda (film) (1997), director Gillian Armstrong
 A Midsummer Night's Dream (1999 film) (1999), director Michael Hoffman
 Jakob the Liar (1999)
 Anna and the King (1999), director Andy Tennant
 The Gathering Storm (2002 film) (2002), TV, director Richard Loncraine
 The Importance of Being Earnest (2002 film) (2002), director Oliver Parker
 Possession (2002 film) (2002), director Neil LaBute
 My House in Umbria (2003), TV, director Richard Loncraine
 Being Julia (2004), director István Szabó
 Fade to Black (2006 film) (2006), director Oliver Parker
 Into the Storm (2009 film) (2009), TV, director Thaddeus O'Sullivan
 From Time to Time (2009), director Julian Fellowes
 Singularity (2013), director Roland Joffé
 Angelica (2015), director Mitchell Lichtenstein

Costume design
 Starstruck (2010 film) (1982)
 Privates on Parade (1983)
 The Ploughman's Lunch (1983)
 Un ballo in maschera (1989), TV

Set and production design
 Women in Love (1969), director Ken Russell

Awards and nominations

Notes

References

External links
Luciana Arrighi's official site

1940 births
Living people
People from Rio de Janeiro (city)
Australian production designers
Italian production designers
Best Art Direction Academy Award winners
National Art School alumni
Members of the Order of Australia
Brazilian emigrants to Australia
Australian emigrants to Italy
Best Production Design AACTA Award winners
Women production designers
Australian female models
Italian female models